Hiroshige is a crater on Mercury. Its name was adopted by the International Astronomical Union (IAU) in 1976, after the Japanese artist Andō Hiroshige.

Hiroshige is east of the craters Murasaki and Kuiper.  Kuiper's rays overlie Hiroshige.

References

Impact craters on Mercury